This is a list of mayors of the city of La Chaux-de-Fonds, Switzerland. Since 1936, the executive of the city of La Chaux-de-Fonds is its Conseil communal with a presiding member, the Président du Conseil communal. Since 2004, the presidency changes annually.

Notes and references 

Chaux-de-Fonds
 
La Chaux-de-Fonds
Lists of mayors (complete 1900-2013)